Joseph A. "Socks" Lanza (1904 – October 11, 1968) was a New York labor racketeer and a member of the Genovese crime family, who controlled the Fulton Fish Market in Lower Manhattan through the United Seafood Worker's Union local 359 from 1923 to 1968.

Biography 
Born in Palermo, Sicily, Lanza immigrated to the United States and settled in New York working as a handler in Lower Manhattan's Fulton Fish Market. Lanza soon became involved in labor union activity and, by 1923, had become an organizer for the United Seafood Workers union (USW). It was during this time that Lanza had become involved in organized crime, eventually becoming a member of the Luciano (and later the Genovese) crime family. As head of the Local 359 USW, Lanza threatened wholesalers with delays in loading and unloading perishable goods resulting in profits of $20 million from the Fulton Fish Market alone. He is the father of Colombo crime family mob associate Harry Lanza born May 4, 1950, who died in 2007 in Hyde Park, New York.

Although convicted of labor racketeering in 1938, Lanza became an important figure in safeguarding New York's waterfront during the early 1940s. Lanza personally advised the Office of Naval Intelligence working with local stevedores and fisherman in tracking submarines, resulting in obtaining key strategic positions in waterfront installations and effectively conduct counter-espionage activities for the Third Naval District.

Although Lanza had helped secure the New York waterfront, he was convicted of extortion the following year and sentenced from 7½ to 10 years imprisonment. Upon his release in 1950, Lanza resumed his leadership role in the Fulton Fish Market and, despite a 1957 arrest for parole violation; he maintained control of the area until his death on October 11, 1968.

See also 
Carmine Romano
Rosario Gangi
Alphonse "Allie Shades" Malangone

Further reading 
Block, Alan A. "A Modern Marriage of Convenience: Organized Crime and U.S. Intelligence," in Organized Crime: A Global Perspective, ed. Robert J. Kelly, 1986.

References 
Kelly, Robert J. Encyclopedia of Organized Crime in the United States. Westport, Connecticut: Greenwood Press, 2000. 
Sifakis, Carl. The Mafia Encyclopedia. New York: Da Capo Press, 2005.

External links 

1904 births
1968 deaths
Burials at Calvary Cemetery (Queens)
Genovese crime family
American gangsters of Sicilian descent
American trade union officials convicted of crimes
American people of Italian descent